This is a list of rural localities in Kurgan Oblast. Kurgan Oblast (Kurganskaya oblast) is a federal subject of Russia (an oblast). Its administrative center is the city of Kurgan. In June 2014, the population was estimated to be 874,100, down from 910,807 recorded in the 2010 Census.

Almenevsky District 
Rural localities in Almenevsky District:

 Almenevo

Belozersky District 
Rural localities in Belozersky District:

 Belozerskoye

Chastoozersky District 
Rural localities in Chastoozersky District:

 Chastoozerye

Ketovsky District 
Rural localities in Ketovsky District:

 Ketovo

Mokrousovsky District 
Rural localities in Mokrousovsky District:

 Mokrousovo

Polovinsky District 
Rural localities in Polovinsky District:

 Polovinnoye

Pritobolny District 
Rural localities in Pritobolny District:

 Glyadyanskoye

Safakulevsky District 
Rural localities in Safakulevsky District:

 Safakulevo

Shatrovsky District 
Rural localities in Shatrovsky District:

 Shatrovo

Tselinny District 
Rural localities in Tselinny District:

 Tselinnoye

Zverinogolovsky District 
Rural localities in Zverinogolovsky District:

 Zverinogolovskoye

See also 

 
 Lists of rural localities in Russia

References 

Kurgan Oblast